Ab-e-gum or Abegum is a town and union council of Kachhi District located  southeast of Quetta near the Chiltan mountains, in the Balochistan province of Pakistan. It also has a railway station  on Rohri–Chaman Railway Line which was built by the British in 1886. The area is an important supplier of gas.

Etymology
Aab-e-gum is a Persian word and it means 'water lost', a name given to the spot for a spring that dives underground nearby.

References

Populated places in Kachhi District
Union councils of Balochistan, Pakistan